Federalna televizija ("Federal television"; locally known as  Federalna TV ("Federal TV") or FTV)  is a public mainstream TV channel operated by RTVFBiH. The program is broadcast on a daily basis, 24 hours from RTVFBiH headquarters located in Sarajevo.

The radio and television program is mainly produced in Bosnian and Croatian . Television program initially aired on two television channels (FTV1 and FTV2). Since April 2003 the television program is reduced to one (just FTV). According to the most recent measurements viewership of television channels in 2012, FTV is most watched television station in Bosnia and Herzegovina with 14.4% share. This television channel broadcasts a variety of programs such as news, talk shows, documentaries, sports, movies, mosaic, children's programs, etc. FTV also broadcasts teletext services (Teletext FTV).

Current line-up

News program
 Dnevnik - main news, sport and weather information every day at 12:00 (Dnevnik 1), 19:30 (Dnevnik 2) and around 23:00 (Dnevnik 3)
 Vijesti - short news, runs at 08:00, 10:00 and 14:15 - 14:45
 Federacija danas - (Federation today) local and regional news from a major cities of FBiH entity which is broadcast at 17:00 (Monday to Friday). Regional tv studios (also called ITC) are located in: Bihać, Mostar, Tuzla, Zenica and Travnik.
 Paralele - very popular magazine about world news and politics hosted by Mladen Marić (Broadcast on Tuesdays, at around 21.00. The editor Mladen Maric died on November 16, 2019. The last Paralele with him was held on November 5, 2019, future status of the show is unknown)

Talk shows
 Pošteno - (Honestly) political talk show hosted by Duška Jurišić with guests (broadcast on Monday at 20:10)
 Odgovorite ljudima - (Answer to people) talk show with guests on various topics from BiH society (broadcast on Wednesday at 20:10)
 Dnevnik D - short primetime interview with guests (broadcast on Thursday at 20:05)

Entertainment
 Jutarnji program - (Mosaic morning show) produced by BHRT and RTVFBiH's
 MasterChef Croatia - reality television cooking show
 TV Bingo Show - national lottery show (15/90) every Friday at 20:10h
 SuperLOTO - national lottery show (6/45) every Tuesdays at 19:10
 LOTO 5/39 - national lottery show (6/45) every Thursdays at 19:10

Documentary Program
 Dokumentarni četvrtak - (Documentary Thursday) The documentary series made in and about BiH (Produced by FTV) or regional authors (like Serbian B92...)
 Sedmica (Week) - the weekly show presents all major cultural events across Federation of BiH (from cinema program, exhibitions, book presentations, concerts of classical music, theater, and up to the opera and ballet)
 Mozaik religija - (Mosaic of religions) - magazine about religion topics in BiH
 Zelena panorama - (Green panorama) program about agriculture in Bosnia and Herzegovina
 Ekovizija - (Eco vision) programs on environmental protection issues in Bosnia and Herzegovina
 Prirodna baština (Natural heritage) educational program dedicated to geography of Bosnia and Herzegovina

Sports program
 International Boxing Federation - broadcasts when Felix Sturm fights
 UEFA Champions League - (in Serbo-Croatian: UEFA Liga prvaka) only Tuesday match (in cooperation with other public broadcasters BHRT and RTRS) because "best-pick" Wednesdays match is broadcast exclusively on commercial television Televizija OBN.
 UEFA Europa League - (in Serbo-Croatian: UEFA Evropska liga) also in cooperation with other public broadcasters BHRT and RTRS

Bosnian series made by FTV
 Viza za budućnost - (in English: Visa for the Future) - the first post-Independence Bosnian sitcom, very popular in whole Balkan region's. Began airing in October 2002 and ended airing in 2008. 
 Lud, zbunjen, normalan - (in English: the Crazy, the Confused, the Normal one) very popular Bosnian TV comedy series that began airing in early September 2007 and ended airing in April 2013.
 Kriza (in English: Crisis) - also popular TV comedy series that began airing in late 2013 and ended airing in June 2014, with rerun in 2016.
 Lutkokaz - TV series for kids. Began airing in 2001 and ended in 2007.

Foreign series
 Peppa Pig - (in Serbo-Croatian: Peppa) British animated series
 Oscar's Oasis - (in Serbo-Croatian: Oskar Oazis) French animated series
 The Garfield Show - (in Serbo-Croatian: Garfild) French-American animated series
 Garfield and Friends - (in Serbo-Croatian: Garfild i prijatelji) American animated series
 Masha and the Bear - (in Serbo-Croatian: Maša i medvjed) Russian animated series
 Masha's Tales - (in Serbo-Croatian: Mašine priče) Russian animated series
 Oggy and the Cockroaches - (in Serbo-Croatian: Ogi i bubašvabe) French animated series
 Simsala Grimm - (in Serbo-Croatian: Najljepše bajke svijeta) German animated series
 Kud puklo da puklo - (Whichever Way the Ball Bounces) - Croatian comedy telenovela
 Poyraz Karayel - (in Serbo-Croatian: Za mog sina) - Turkish drama
 Shopping kraljica - (Shopping Queen) - Croatian reality show
 Miraculous: Tales of Ladybug & Cat Noir - (in Serbo-Croatian: Miraculous: Pustolovine Bubamare i Crnog Mačka) - French animated series

Formerly
 Nepobedivo srce - (Invincible Heart) - Serbian soap opera 
 Greh njene majke - (The Sin of Her Mother) - Serbian soap opera 
 Ranjeni orao - (Wounded Eagle) - Serbian soap opera 
 Aşk ve Ceza - (in Serbo-Croatian: Ljubav i kazna) Turkish soap opera 
 Ezel - Turkish soap opera (in cooperation with BHT 1)
 Larin izbor - Croatian soap opera (Season 1 in cooperation with RTRS)
 Bolji život - Yugoslav TV series with mixed elements of soap opera, comedy and drama
 Luda kuća - (Crazy House) Croatian comedy series 
 Sve će biti dobro (Everything will be fine) - Croatian soap opera
 Dolina sunca (Sun valley) - Croatian soap opera
 Villa Maria - Croatian soap opera 
 Zora dubrovačka (Dubrovnik's Dawn) - Croatian telenovela
 Bitange i princeze - Croatian comedy series

See also
 RTVBiH
 Federalni Radio

References

External links 
 

Communications in Bosnia and Herzegovina
Multilingual broadcasters
Publicly funded broadcasters
Television channels and stations established in 2001
Television networks in Bosnia and Herzegovina
Television stations in Bosnia and Herzegovina
Mass media in Sarajevo
RTVFBIH